Edward Sauerhering (June 24, 1864 – March 1, 1924) was a U.S. Representative from Wisconsin.

Biography
Born in Mayville, Wisconsin on June 24, 1864, Sauerhering attended the public schools.
He graduated from the Chicago College of Pharmacy in 1885.
He engaged in the drug business in Chicago, Illinois, for three years.
He returned to Mayville, Wisconsin, and continued in the same business.

Sauerhering was elected as a Republican to the Fifty-fourth and Fifty-fifth Congresses (March 4, 1895 – March 3, 1899). He was the representative for Wisconsin's 2nd congressional district. He was not a candidate for renomination in 1898 to the Fifty-sixth Congress.
He was the Superintendent of the commission of public works of Mayville from 1909 till 1918.
He was also engaged in the construction of waterworks.
He was Justice of the Peace 1912–1920.
He died in Mayville, Wisconsin, on March 1, 1924.
He was interred in Graceland Cemetery.

References

External links
 

1864 births
1924 deaths
People from Mayville, Wisconsin
Wisconsin state court judges
Republican Party members of the United States House of Representatives from Wisconsin